The following is a list of county roads in Holmes County, Florida.  All county roads are maintained by the county in which they reside.

County roads in Holmes County

References

FDOT Map of Holmes County
FDOT GIS data, accessed January 2014

 
County